Building Services Engineering Research and Technology is a bimonthly peer-reviewed scientific journal that covers the field of building services engineering. The journal was established in 1980 and is published by SAGE Publishing on behalf of the Chartered Institution of Building Services Engineers.

Abstracting and indexing
The journal is abstracted and indexed in Scopus and the Science Citation Index Expanded. According to the Journal Citation Reports, its 2021 impact factor is 2.473.

References

External links

Bimonthly journals
SAGE Publishing academic journals
English-language journals
Engineering journals
Publications established in 1980